Zorillodontops is an extinct genus of therocephalian therapsids from the Early Triassic of South Africa.

See also

 List of therapsids

References

 The main groups of non-mammalian synapsids at Mikko's Phylogeny Archive

Akidnognathids
Early Triassic synapsids of Africa
Early Triassic life
Fossil taxa described in 1969
Therocephalia genera